Martin Stadium, originally known as Lewis Park, was a baseball park in Memphis, Tennessee, which served as the home stadium of the Memphis Red Sox, a Negro league baseball team, in the 1920s through 1959. The park was built in 1923 by the team owner, local businessman Robert S. Lewis. The Red Sox were one of only a few teams in the Negro leagues to have owned their own stadium, allowing them scheduling flexibility not widely enjoyed by their peers and removing the cost of gate fees on leased facilities.

The ballpark was included in the 1927 sale of the baseball team from Lewis to W.S. Martin and his brothers, resulting in the name being changed to reference the new owners. The facility was enlarged, and the stadium was built in 1947 at a cost of US$200,000. After spending decades more acting as the home of the Red Sox and as a space for community events, the Martin brothers sold the stadium in 1960 after disbanding the baseball team, whereupon it was demolished the next year.  The site is now home to a semi-truck dealer and has an historical marker.

See also
 List of baseball parks in Memphis, Tennessee

References 

Negro league baseball venues
Sports venues in Memphis, Tennessee
Baseball venues in Tennessee
Defunct sports venues in Tennessee
1923 establishments in Tennessee
Sports venues completed in 1923
1961 disestablishments in Tennessee
Sports venues demolished in 1961